Rajac is a village 22 km south of Negotin in Serbia. It is known for its historic wine cellars and is a popular touristic destination. Nearby, there is a village of Rogljevo, also known by historic wine cellars.

History
The village church, dedicated to the Ascension (Вазнесења Господњег), was built in 1870.

References

Populated places in Bor District